Caseolus subcalliferus is a species of air-breathing land snail, a terrestrial pulmonate gastropod mollusk in the family Geometridae, the hairy snails and their allies. 

This species is endemic to Porto Santo, Portugal.

Habitat
It lives on upper parts of various plants including Juncus maritimus.

Conservation
The survival of this species is threatened by habitat loss, mainly from land-use management or fire, but also habitat degradation due to introduction of invasive plants.

References

 Bank, R. A.; Neubert, E. (2017). Checklist of the land and freshwater Gastropoda of Europe. Last update: July 16th, 2017

Endemic fauna of Madeira
Molluscs of Europe
subcalliferus
Gastropods described in 1854
Taxonomy articles created by Polbot